Asia Wings  was a Kazakh airline based in Karagandy, and operated 6 domestic services from Karaganda and Almaty. The airline ceased all operations in 2012.

Destinations
Former regular routes included:
ALA–KOV
ALA–PPK
ALA–KGF
KGF–UKK
KGF–KZO
KGF–DZN
KGF–ALA

Fleet 
The Asia Wings fleet consisted the following aircraft:

References

External links

Defunct airlines of Kazakhstan
Airlines established in 2010
Airlines disestablished in 2012